The San Antonio Wings were an American football team who played in the World Football League in 1975. The team started as the Florida Blazers in 1974, then moved to San Antonio in 1975 and became the San Antonio Wings.

History
The Florida Blazers never drew well, leading team owner Rommie Loudd to openly discuss moving the team to Atlanta in the middle of the 1974 season.  The players and coaches were not paid for three months. Shortly after the Blazers' defeat in the World Bowl, Loudd was arrested on tax evasion and cocaine trafficking charges. He was convicted on the latter charge and served three years in prison. He was also sentenced to two years in prison for possession and distribution of cocaine.

The Blazers were one of two teams, the other being the Detroit Wheels, to outright fold after 1974 with no direct replacement in their markets in 1975 (not counting teams that moved midseason). Only one expansion team would be added, with Norman Bevan buying the franchise rights and establishing a team in San Antonio.

The new Wings were restocked with an expansion draft but retained 16 former Blazers, including running back Jim Strong and tight end Luther Palmer. Larry Grantham, a linebacker on the 1974 Blazers, retired but joined the Wings' coaching staff. The team's head coach was Perry Moss, a former head coach at Marshall and a former NFL assistant coach; Blazers coach Jack Pardee, who wanted nothing more to do with the WFL, returned to the NFL during the offseason.

Quarterback Johnnie Walton, a relic from the old Continental Football League who had spent most of the early 1970s bouncing around NFL practice squads, led the WFL in passing in 1975. The Wings held their home games at Alamo Stadium, which seated 25,000. San Antonio finished with a 7-6 record (winning all seven home games and losing all six road games) before the league folded on October 22, 1975.

1975 regular season

See also
 1975 World Football League season
 Florida Blazers

References

External links
 San Antonio Wings 1975 season at WorldFootballLeague.org
 San Antonio Wings at FunWhileItLasted.net
 San Antonio Wings Helmets

 
Sports teams in San Antonio
Defunct American football teams in Texas
1975 establishments in Texas
1975 disestablishments in Texas
American football teams established in 1975
American football teams disestablished in 1975